Brownlee is an unincorporated community and census-designated place in Cherry County, Nebraska, United States. As of the 2010 census it had a population of 15.

History
Brownlee was given the maiden name of the founder's grandmother.

Demographics

References

Census-designated places in Nebraska
Census-designated places in Cherry County, Nebraska